Rhodium acetylacetonate is the coordination complex with the formula Rh(O2C5H7)3, which is sometimes known as Rh(acac)3.  The molecule has D3-symmetry. It is a yellow-orange solid that is soluble in organic solvents.

It is prepared from RhCl3(H2O)3 and acetylacetone.  The complex has been resolved into individual enantiomers by separation of its adduct with dibenzoyltartaric acid.

References

Rhodium(III) compounds
Acetylacetonate complexes